António Ludgero Carvalho Pina Lopes (born 17 August 1997), is a Portuguese futsal player who plays for Quinta dos Lombos and the Portugal national team.

References

External links

1997 births
Living people
Portuguese men's futsal players
Sporting CP futsal players
Place of birth missing (living people)